Andrew Nelson or Andy Nelson may refer to:

Sports
 Andy Nelson (American football) (born 1933), former American football player
 Andy Nelson (footballer) (born 1935), English footballer
 Andrew Nelson (footballer) (born 1997), English footballer
 Andrew Nelson (volleyball) (born 1993), Canadian volleyball player
 Andy Nelson (baseball) (1884–?), baseball player

Other
 Andrew Nelson, co-founder of tech company TomorrowNow
 Andrew Nelson, drummer for the band Tiger Saw
 Andy Nelson (sound engineer), sound engineer
 Andrew Nelson (author), writer and professor
 Andrew Nelson (lexicographer) (1893–1975), missionary and lexicographer
 Andrew Nelson, listed as a defender of the Alamo
 Andrew Nelson, Minnesota gubernatorial candidate in 1928

See also
Drew Nelson (disambiguation)
Nelson (surname)